Charaxes fionae is a butterfly in the family Nymphalidae. It is found in central, southern and eastern Zambia, Malawi and western Tanzania.

Description
The male differs from that of Charaxes phaeus in the darker underside, smaller greenish spots on the upperside, and narrower pale wing margins.

Biology
The habitat consists of Brachystegia woodland.

The larvae feed on Acacia amythethophylla, Dalbergia boehmii and Entada abyssinica.

References

External links
Charaxes fionae images at Consortium for the Barcode of Life

Butterflies described in 1977
fionae